Flavien Enzo Thiedort Boyomo (born 7 October 2001) is a professional footballer who plays as a centre back for Segunda División club Albacete Balompié. Born in France, he represents Cameroon internationally.

Club career
Boyomo joined Blackburn Rovers' Academy in 2016, from Toulouse FC. He progressed through the club's youth setup, but left in June 2020 after failing to agree new terms.

After leaving Blackburn, Boyomo moved to Spain and joined Albacete Balompié, being initially assigned to the reserves in Tercera División. He made his first team debut on 26 September 2020, starting in a 0–1 away loss against CF Fuenlabrada in the Segunda División championship.

Boyomo scored his first professional goal on 25 October 2020, netting the opener in a 2–1 home defeat of Rayo Vallecano. On 23 December, he renewed his contract until 2024.

International career 
Thanks to his origins, Boyomo could choose to represent either France or Cameroon at international level.

In March 2023, he received his first call-up to the Cameroon senior national team, under head coach Rigobert Song, for both the 2023 Africa Cup of Nations qualification matches against Namibia.

Personal life
Born in France, Boyomo is of Cameroonian descent.

References

External links

2001 births
Living people
Footballers from Toulouse
French sportspeople of Cameroonian descent
French footballers
Association football defenders
Blackburn Rovers F.C. players
Segunda División players
Primera Federación players
Albacete Balompié players
French expatriate footballers
French expatriate sportspeople in England
French expatriate sportspeople in Spain
Expatriate footballers in England
Expatriate footballers in Spain